is a train station in Rumoi, Hokkaidō, Japan.

Lines
Hokkaido Railway Company
Rumoi Main Line

Station layout 
This station has two opposed side platforms serving two tracks. This is the only station where train meet is possible in Rumoi Main Line.

Adjacent stations

References

Stations of Hokkaido Railway Company
Railway stations in Hokkaido Prefecture
Railway stations in Japan opened in 1910